Andrew Terence Reinholds (born 11 November 1967) is a former New Zealand cricketer who played for the Auckland Aces in the mid-1990s and he also played for North Island in the Plunket Shield. He was born in Wellington.

See also
 List of Auckland representative cricketers

References

External links
Cricinfo Profile

1967 births
Living people
New Zealand cricketers
Auckland cricketers
North Island cricketers